Erich Bergel (1 June 1930 – 3 May 1998) was a trumpet player and conductor.

Career 
Born in Râşnov, Bergel was a flutist of the Hermannstädter Philharmoniker age 18. From 1950 to 1955 he studied conducting, organ and composition at the Gheorghe Dima Music Academy of Cluj-Napoca (Klausenburg). He was appointed principal conductor of the Cluj Philharmonic Orchestra and guest conductor of the Bucharest Philharmonic Orchestra.

He defected to Germany, where he was promoted by Herbert von Karajan. He conducted notable orchestras on tours to Paris, Auckland, Los Angeles, Berlin, Vienna and Cape Town. He was also a teacher at the Hochschule der Künste in Berlin.

From 1971 to 1974 he was the principal conductor of the Nordwestdeutsche Philharmonie in Herford. He conducted them in a recording of Les Djinns, a symphonic poem for piano and orchestra of César Franck, with pianist Volker Banfield. In 1989 he was appointed principal conductor for life of the Budapest Philharmonic Orchestra. In 1991 he recorded Béla Bartók's second violin concerto with Silvia Marcovici and the Budapest Radio Orchestra. He recorded his arrangement of Bach's Die Kunst der Fuge with the Cluj Philharmonic Orchestra. He died in Ruhpolding.

Publications 
 Johann Sebastian Bach, die Kunst der Fuge: Ihre geistige Grundlage im Zeichen der thematischen Bipolarität, Brockhaus Musikverlag Bonn, 1980, 
 Bachs letzte Fuge, Brockhaus Musikverlag Bonn, 1985,

Literature 
 Hans Bergel: Erich Bergel. Ein Musikerleben, Gehann-Musik-Verlag, 2006,

References

External links
 Erich Bergel on Budapest Music Centre
 Erich Bergel on bach-cantatas
 Erich Bergel on the website of Forum der Deutschen im Kreis Kronstadt (in German)

People from Râșnov
German male conductors (music)
Academic staff of the Berlin University of the Arts
1930 births
1998 deaths
20th-century German conductors (music)
20th-century German male musicians